Birds are the group of amniotes with the smallest genomes. Whereas mammal and reptilian genomes range between 1.0 and 8.2 giga base pairs (Gb), bird genomes have sizes between 0.91 Gb (black-chinned hummingbird, Archilochus alexandri) and 1.3 Gb (common ostrich, Struthio camelus). Just as happens to any other living being, bird genomes’ reflect the action of natural selection upon these animals. Their genomes are the basis of their morphology and behaviour.

Current features of bird genomes
Compared to any other group of tetrapods, birds are the ones that have less repeated elements in their genomes, comprising only 4–10 % of its extent, a rather small number when compared to the 34–52 % that they take up in mammals. Another example of genome reduction in birds is that of short interspersed nuclear elements (SINEs). Their total size has been drastically reduced, averaging only 1.3 mega base pairs (Mb), whereas those of American alligator (Alligator mississippiensis) total an average of 12.6 Mb, and those from the green sea turtle (Chelonia mydas) average 34.9 Mb. These data suggest that the last common ancestor of modern birds already had a reduced number of SINEs.

It can also be appreciated that the mean size of introns, intergenic sequences, and even exons is significantly reduced. Mammal and reptilian introns have an average size of 4.3 kb and 3.1 kb respectively, whereas those of birds are only 2.1 kb long. Likewise, gene spacing is 91 kb (average) for mammals and 61 kb for reptiles, but only 49 kb in birds. It is known that similar reductions have also taken place in bats. This fact suggests that genome-size reduction could give advantages for flying animals, such as rapid gene-expression regulation, which is required in powered flight. Some researchers remark that, in fact, bird genomes have undergone successive deletions, ruling out the possibility of genomic expansion in mammals and reptiles.

Also, there is no such genomic loss in any vertebrate group as great as that of birds. Its possible that the early chromosomic fragmentation event that lead to the appearance of microchromosomes in birds significantly contributed to this gene loss. These fragmentation events must have taken place in a common ancestor of most birds, since approximately every two out of three species studied have at least 30 pairs of microchromosomes, 2n = 80 being the size of the average karyotype of birds (with the only exception the family Falconidae, which are 2n = 6–12).

Macrosynteny studies have determined that, in vocal learner birds, genes have undergone a deeper rearrangement along their corresponding chromosomes than those of non-vocal learner birds. In addition to that, microsynteny studies revealed that birds possess a higher number of orthologous genes that maintain synteny. This proves that gene order along chromosomes is more conserved in birds than in other animal groups. A clear example are genes coding for haemoglobin subunits. These genes are easily duplicated and lost. As a consequence, there are huge differences regarding the number and relative position of the genes of alpha-hemoglobins and beta-hemoglobins in mammals. In birds, that is not the case. Both position and number of these genes are highly conserved among them.

Birds' point mutation rate (1.9 mutations per site per Ma) is smaller than that of mammals (2.7 mutations per site per Ma). This rate is also smaller among aequornithes (water birds) than that of telluraves (land birds). In this last group, birds of prey have the smallest mutation rate, and songbirds have the highest. These rates are consistent with the broad distribution of birds in different environments, and the changes in phenotype consequent of evolutive pressure exert by the different ecological niches as they were been occupied.

The presence of functional restrictions in genome self-regulation can be studied by comparing the genomes of species whose last common ancestor is more ancient. It is known that, approximately, 7.5 % of bird genome is comprised by highly conserved elements (HCEs). Of those HCEs, 12.6 % are directly involved in protein coding genes functionality. Non-coding HCEs that are bird specific (not found in mammals) happen to be related with the regulation of the activity of transcription factors related to metabolism. In comparison, mammal HCEs are related to controlling cell signalling, development, and response to stimuli.

Evolutionary genomic changes
Genetic evolution is not homogeneous across the genome. This can be assayed using Ka/Ks ratio studies (also known as dN/dS). The ratio is used to estimate the balance between neutral mutations, purifying mutations and beneficial mutations.

In birds, Z-chromosome genes have the highest variability. This may  be due to the fact that the Z-chromosome has the lowest gene density. Also, gene variability is higher in macrochromosomes than in microchromosomes. This could be related to the lower recombination frequency of microchromosomes, which is a consequence of the smaller size and greater gene density.

When compared to mammals, it can be appreciated that the fastest evolving bird genes are those that mediate development, whereas in mammals the fastest evolving genes are those that mediate in the development of the central nervous system.

Genome relation to singing
It seems that the ability to sing has appeared independently at least two times in birds (possibly three): one in the common ancestor of hummingbirds and another in the common antecessor of songbirds and parrots. They all have in common a number of neuronal circuits that cannot be found in non-vocal learner species. A dN/dS analysis showed conserved evolution in 227 genes, most of which are highly expressed in the regions of the brain that control singing. Furthermore, 20 % of them seemed to be regulated by singing.

Genomic evolution of morphological features
In order to fly, bird ancestors had to undergo a series of changes at the molecular level that translate into changes at morphological level. Approximately half of the genes involved in ossification are known to have been positively selected. Some relevant examples are AHSG, that controls bone mineralization density, and P2RX7, which is associated to bone homeostasis. Their action would be responsible for the differences observed between mammal and bird bones.

Something similar occurs with the respiratory system. In mammals, the total inner volume of lungs changes during ventilation. However, this does not happen in birds. They make the air circulate through their lungs by contracting and expanding their air sacs. Five genes are involved in this process in mammals and birds.

Feathers are one of the most characteristic features of birds, along with the beak. Feathers are formed of α- and β-keratins. Compared to reptiles and mammals, α-keratin protein family has been reduced in birds, whereas β-keratins has expanded enormously. Since every major bird lineage possess at least one protein of each of the six β-keratin groups, it can be said that their last common ancestor already possessed a large diversity of this kind of protein. 56 % of β-keratins are feather-specific and can only be found in birds, whereas those that make up scales and claws can also be found in reptiles. The variety and number of copies of these genes seems to correlate with the bird's lifestyle, land birds having a larger variety, and the variety being larger still in domestic birds.

Birds are also known for being toothless. This feature seems to be a consequence of several modifications and deletions which occurred in the exons of the genes implicated in the formation of enamel and dentine. It is thought that the common ancestor of birds already lacked mineralized teeth, and that later genome changes pushed the situation to the current status.

Also, birds have the best vision system known in vertebrates. They have a higher number of photoreceptors, and most birds are tetrachromats. The only exception are penguins, which have only three functional opsin genes (and hence are trichromats). This exception could be related to the aquatic lifestyle, since marine mammals have also lost either one or two cone opsin genes.

In many birds the right ovary has become non-functional. There are two ovary development-related genes, MMP19 and AKR1C3, that have disappeared in birds. The fact that a high number of genes related to spermatogenesis are evolving fast (which does not happen in those related to ovogenensis) suggest that males undergo a stronger selective pressure.

Clarification of early diversification of birds
The abundance of genomic data available nowadays has enabled research to elucidate the early evolution and divergence of bird groups, and has produced a much more detailed phylogenetic tree. Genomic research has shown that in order to make a good phylogenetic tree it is not enough to use a single gene. This is due to incomplete lineage sorting of genes.

The main problems found in these studies are the low resolution of single-gene based phylogenetic trees and the fact that coding DNA data are scarce and, sometimes, treacherous due to convergent evolution. For example, when there is a mistake in base pairing, DNA repair machinery has a bias favoring GC pairs.

Phylogenetic analysis suggests an early fast radiation giving rise to 36 bird lineages in a period of 10–15 My, relatively quick on an evolutionary timescale. Besides, that period of time includes the massive extinction event that took place 65 Mya. It is coherent that both events took place close in time, since the sudden extinction of such a big number of species would have been beneficial for the survivors, since many niches would have been freed, contributing to the diversification of surviving species. This estimation is also consistent with fossil record data, as well as with actual mammal evolution estimates.

One of the biggest differences between this tree and previous classifications is the separation between accipitrifomes and Falconiformes, since, traditionally, Falconiformes used to include al the species of these two groups.

References 

Evolution of birds
Genomics
Evolutionary biology